Chakhmaq Bolagh-e Olya (also Romanized as Chakhmāq Bolāgh-e ‘Olyā; also known as Chakhmakh-bulag-Okhary, Chakhmāq Bolāgh Bālā, Chakhmāq Bolāgh-e Bālā, Chākhmāqbolāgh-e ‘Olyā, Chakhmāq Bolāgh-e Yūkhārī, and Chaqmāq Bulāgh Yukāri) is a village in Mavazekhan-e Shomali Rural District, Khvajeh District, Heris County, East Azerbaijan Province, Iran. At the 2006 census, its population was 38, in 8 families.

References 

Populated places in Heris County